{{Infobox military unit
|unit_name                     = Gibborim ha-David  הַגִּבֹּרִ֛ים
|image                         = 
|caption                       = 
|start_date                    = 1010 BCE
|country                       = United Monarchy
|branch                        = 
|type                          = Special operations force, Shock troopers
|role                          = Special operations, Infantry
|size                          = 37
|command_structure             = 
|garrison                      = 
|garrison_label                = 
|nickname                      = David’s Mighty Warriors
|allegiance                    = David
|patron                        = 
|equipment                     = 
|equipment_label               = 
|battles                       = 
|decorations                   = 
|battle_honours                = 
|commander2                    = 
|commander2_label              = 
|commander1                    = David
|commander1_label              = Founder & Commander
|disbanded                     = 970 BCE

|identification_symbol         = 
|identification_symbol_label   = 
|identification_symbol_2       = 
|identification_symbol_2_label = 
The International Standard Version calls them "David's special forces".

A similar list is given in 1 Chronicles 11:10–47 but with several variations, and sixteen more names.

The text divides them into the "Three", of which there are three, and "Thirty'", of which there are more than thirty. The text explicitly states that there are 37 individuals in all, but it is unclear whether this refers to The Thirty, which may or may not contain The Three, or the combined total of both groups. The text refers to The Three and The Thirty as though they were both important entities, and not just an arbitrary list of three or 30-plus significant men.

Some textual scholars regard the passages referring to The Three and The Thirty as having come from either a source distinct to the main sources in the Books of Samuel, or being otherwise out of place. Since parts of the text have distinct stylistic differences from other portions—appearing as a list, as a series of character introductions, or as a flowing narrative—Some suspect that the passages may themselves be compiled from multiple source documents. Further, as 2 Samuel 23:23–24 reads "... David put him in command of his bodyguard, Asahel, brother of Joab. Among the thirty were...", the text is regarded as corrupted, and the middle of verse 23:24 (between the words Joab and Among) is generally presumed to have been lost (some translations move Among the thirty were to be before Asahel, which smooths over the issue).

Complete list

The Three
The Three are named Ishbaal the Tahkemonite ("thou will make me wise"), Eleazar ("God has helped") son of Dodo ("his beloved") the Ahohite ("brother of rest"), and Shammah son of Agee the Hararite.

The Three are also mentioned in the Book of Chronicles. According to one reading, the first of these three is named as Jashobeam instead. However, the Septuagint version of the same passage presents a name that scholars regard as clearly being a transliteration from Isbosheth—the euphemism employed in some parts of the Bible for the name Ishbaal. Hence the first member of The Three was possibly Ishbaal, Saul's son and heir; the text having become corrupted either deliberately (e.g. due to an editor that sought to downplay Ishbaal's heroism) or accidentally. According to other translations following the Masoretic text more closely, Jashobeam is the head of "thirty" or "chief officers" but not even part of the Three.

Ishbaal is described as being the leader and is said to have killed 800 men in a single encounter. Ishbaal is also described as a Tahkemonite, which is probably a corruption of Hacmonite, the latter being how he is described by the Book of Chronicles.

Eleazar is described as standing his ground against the Philistines at Pas Dammim when the rest of the Hebrews ran away, and as successfully defeating them. Similarly Shammah is described as having stood his ground when the Philistines attacked a "field of ripe lentils" despite the rest of his associates dispersing, and as having defeated the attackers.

The Thirty
The Thirty are not heavily described by the text, merely listed. There are several differences between the ancient manuscripts of the list, whether they are of the Masoretic text or of the Septuagint. Textual scholars generally consider the Septuagint to be more reliable than the Masoretic text in regard to this list, particularly since the Masoretic text of Chronicles matches the Septuagint version of the Books of Samuel more closely than the Masoretic version. In addition there are a few places where it is uncertain whether one person is referred to or if it is two people. The individuals that are clearly identified are:
Elhanan son of Dodo from Bethlehem
Shammah from Arad
Helez from Beth-Palet
Ira son of Ikkesh from Tekoa
Abiezer from Anathoth
a man from Hushah that was named either Mebunnai (according to the masoretic text) or was named Sibbecai (according to the Septuagint and Chronicles)
Ilai the Ahohite, descended from Ahoah
Maharai from Netophah
Heleb son of Baanah from Netophah
Ithai son of Ribai from Gibeah
Benaiah from Pirathon
a man from the ravines of Gaash that was named Hiddai (according to the masoretic text) or was named Hurai (according to the Septuagint and Chronicles)
Abi-Albon from Beth-Arabah
Azmaveth from Bahurim
Eliahba from Shaalbim
the (unnamed) sons of a man that was either named Hashem and was from Gizon (according to the Septuagint and Chronicles) or was named 16. Jashen (according to the masoretic text)
Ahiam from Arad, whose father was either named Sharar (according to the masoretic text) or was named Sacar (according to the Septuagint and Chronicles)
Eliphelet from Maacah, whose father was either named Ahasbai (according to the Books of Samuel) or Ur (according to Chronicles)
Eliam son of Ahithophel from Giloh
Hezro from Carmel
Zelek from Ammon
Ira from Jattir
Gareb from Jattir
Uriah the Hittite.

In addition to these, there are a few cases where an individual is named, and is then followed by a description that is unclear as to whether it refers to them, or whether it refers to an additional unnamed person:
Naharai from Beeroth, (and/who is) the armour-bearer of Joab
Igal son of Nathan from Zobah, (and/who is) the son of a man named Hagri (according to the masoretic text and Chronicles) or Haggadi (according to the Septuagint).

For the remaining names of the list, there are some significant textual issues, the most minor of which being that the Books of Samuel lists Paarai the Arbite but the Book of Chronicles lists Naarai son of Exbai instead. The list in Samuel is generally presented in pairs, where each member of a pair comes from a similar location to the other member, but this pattern is broken by Shammah (from Arad), Elika (from Arad), and Helez (from Beth-Palet), who make a trio; in Chronicles, however, Elika isn't even listed.

The final name(s) on the list itself is/are given by the masoretic text as Jonathan son of Shammah from Arad, but the septuagint has Jonathan, [and] Shammah from Arad; the septuagint implies that the passage was understood to refer to a Jonathan significant enough to need no further qualification, thus probably referring to the Jonathan that elsewhere is described as a son of Saul—which Jonathan being a son of Shammah would contradict.

According to textual scholars Jonathan is distinctly associated by other parts of the Books of Samuel with the Hebrews, while Saul is distinctly associated with the Israelites (who the text consistently treats as a distinct group from the Hebrews), and his being Saul's son is considered by some textual scholars as more ethnological than necessarily literal.

It is more likely that this was Jonathan the son of Shemea, David’s brother mentioned in 1 Chronicles 20:7 as having defeated a Philistine giant.

As the list is proceeded with ...David put him in command of his bodyguard. Asahel, brother of Joab. Among the thirty were..... , an Asahel the brother of Joab is sometimes considered to be part of the list, having become misplaced rather than the start of a lost passage.

Three of The Thirty

The text also contains a narrative passage about "three of The Thirty". It is unclear from the text whether this refers to The Three, hence implying that The Three were a special group within The Thirty, or whether it refers to another group of three individuals. The narrative, which recounts a single exploit, ends with "such were the exploits of the three mighty men", and textual scholars believe that the narrative may be an extract from a larger group of tales concerning these three. The flowing narrative differs in style from the more abrupt introductions to individual members of The Three and The Thirty that surround it, and textual scholars believe that it may originally have been from a different document.

In the narrative, three of the thirty visit David when he is located at the cave of Adullam. While there, David expresses a heartfelt desire for water from a well near Bethlehem, which the narrative states was occupied by Philistines. The three of the thirty therefore forcefully break past the Philistines, and draw water from the well, which they take back to David. David refuses to drink the water, instead pouring it out "before Yahweh", arguing that it was the blood'' of the men who had risked their lives. Biblical scholars argue that the description of David pouring out the water is a reference to David offering the water to Yahweh as a libation.

Abishai

An additional account, continuing on from the description of The Three, which was interrupted by the narrative concerning David's thirst, describes Abishai, the brother of Joab. According to the text, he killed 300 men with a spear, and so became famous among The Thirty, though not as famous and respected as The Three. The text states that despite the fame and respect he was not included among The Three, suggesting that being a part of The Three is not just a group of famous people, but something which an individual could in some way gain membership, with criteria that involved more than fame and honour.

According to most manuscripts of the masoretic text, Abishai became the commander of The Three, but according to the Syriac Peshitta, and a few masoretic text manuscripts, Abishai instead became the commander of The Thirty. The text explicitly states that Abishai became the commander of The Three despite not being among them, but it is unclear whether this is directly because he was their commander (as with the masoretic text), or whether he was commander of The Thirty (as with the Septuagint) and The Three were a subgroup of The Thirty (as possibly implied by the narrative about "three of The Thirty").

Benaiah
Benaiah is singled out by the text for being a particularly great warrior, as famous as The Three, and significantly more respected than any of The Thirty, for which reason he was put in charge of the royal bodyguard. As with Abishai, the text emphasizes that despite these qualities, Benaiah was not a member of The Three. The text gives a list of Benaiah's "great exploits", suggesting that these are what brought him fame and honor; compared with the feats ascribed by the text to Abishai, and to the members of The Three, Benaiah's feats are somewhat minor (though regarded by scholars as more realistic):
Killing two of Moab's best warriors
Killing a lion in a pit on a snowy day
Attacking a 7 1/2 foot tall Egyptian with a club, stealing the spear that the Egyptian was using, and killing the Egyptian with it.

See also
Cherethites and Pelethites
English translations of the Bible
Septuagint
Masoretic text
Syriac Peshitta

Notes

References

 
People associated  with David